São João de Brito (English: Saint John de Britto) was a Portuguese parish (freguesia) in the municipality of Lisbon. It was created on February 7, 1959, and named after the saint John de Britto. At the administrative reorganization of Lisbon on 8 December 2012 it became part of the parish Alvalade.

Main sites
São João de Brito Church
Júlio de Matos Hospital
Laboratório Nacional de Engenharia Civil (National Civil Engineering Laboratory)
Saint Anthony of Lisbon's Statue

References 

Former parishes of Lisbon